Jason Elliott may refer to:

Jason Elliott (ice hockey) (born 1975), Canadian hockey player
Jason Elliott (politician) (born 1970), American politician

See also
Jason Elliot (born 1965), British writer